Osetnica  is a village in the administrative district of Gmina Chojnów, within Legnica County, Lower Silesian Voivodeship, in south-western Poland. Until 1945 it was in the German province of Silesia.

References

Osetnica